Sylvestre Arnaud Séka (born 30 October 1985 in Abomey) is a Beninese football player who currently plays in Benin for Tonnerre d'Abomey FC.

International career
Séka played his debut for the Benin national football team  at 2010 African Cup of Nations in Angola.

References

1985 births
Living people
Beninese footballers
Benin international footballers
2010 Africa Cup of Nations players
People from Abomey

Association football midfielders